During the night of 31 December 2022/1 January 2023, the Ukrainian Ground Forces launched a rocket strike on the building of Professional Technical School (PTU) No. 19 in Makiivka, Donetsk Oblast. Ukrainian officials claimed that the attack killed 400 Russian troops, while Russian officials initially confirmed that 63 troops were killed, but raised the death toll to 89 two days later. The attack was carried out using HIMARS rockets, and resulted in the destruction of the building and nearby military equipment.

Attack 
Mobilized men from Saratov Oblast were crowded together in the building of PTU No. 19 at 48 Kremlivska Street, with ammunition piles in the basement below them. Ukrainian forces made three attacks with M142 HIMARS at 23:57, 23:59 and 00:00 hours. Two out of six rockets were intercepted, according to the Russian military, while the remaining rockets hit the building and detonated the ammunition stored below.

Casualties 
Between 400 and 500 deaths and 300 injuries were reported by the Ukrainian army. However, the General Staff of the Ukrainian Armed Forces did not present the numbers in its daily update of Russian losses. Pro-Russian Telegram channels reported the deaths of hundreds of mobilized troops. An unnamed source close to the leadership of Donetsk Oblast installed by Russia only confirmed to Reuters "dozens" of dead, calling reports of a death toll above100 exaggerated. On 2 January, Russia initially acknowledged 63 soldiers had died in the attack, updating the figure two days later to 89 dead. Mobilized soldiers from Samara Oblast, part of the 1444th Motor Rifle Regiment, were among those killed in Makiivka. The regiment's deputy commander, Lieutenant Colonel Bachurin, was reported to be among the dead. On 3 February 2023, BBC News Russian reported they had documented the deaths of 101 soldiers in the attack, while 18 remained missing. By 17 March 2023, they updated the confirmed number of dead to 139.

The General Staff of Ukraine claimed 10 vehicles destroyed.

On 11 January 2023, the Ukrainian Defence Ministry's Chief Intelligence Department released a phone call that it said was intercepted between a Russian "occupier" and her husband. The woman told her husband that another soldier had "personally transported the bodies of these people from Makiivka and from another [settlement]... from the hospital. He says 610 people died in Makiivka. He says, ‘I drove 12 Kamaz trucks [filled with bodies – ed.]’."

Reactions 
Russian military correspondents criticized the deployment of so many soldiers in an unsafe building. An official in the Russian-controlled Donetsk administration, Daniil Bezsonov, called for the military officers responsible to be "punished" for placing a large number of troops at this barracks. Igor Girkin wrote on Telegram "many hundreds ... remained under the rubble", and "Our generals are untrainable in principle". Russian-appointed Donetsk officials blamed the soldiers for having accessed their mobile phones. Russian parliamentarian Sergey Mironov has called for the prosecution of responsible officials "whether they wear epaulets or not".

In retaliation, Russian forces destroyed an ice arena in Druzhkivka, allegedly housing Ukrainian military personnel, on 3 January. Russia's Ministry of Defence claimed the attack killed up to 200 Ukrainian soldiers and destroyed four HIMARS launchers. According to Ukrainian authorities, two people were injured in the attack on Druzhkivka.

Russia claimed to have attacked Ukrainian barracks in Kramatorsk as revenge for the Ukrainian attack on Russian barracks at Makiivka. A Finnish and more than one Reuters journalist visited the site and reported that there was no evidence of damage to any dormitories nor any casualties, or even evidence that Ukrainian soldiers were present in the building.

See also 
Timeline of the 2022 Russian invasion of Ukraine: phase 3

References

January 2023 events in Russia
January 2023 events in Ukraine
December 2022 events in Russia
December 2022 events in Ukraine
January 2023 events in Europe
Explosions in 2022
Explosions in 2023
Eastern Ukraine offensive
History of Donetsk Oblast
Military shelling
Airstrikes during the 2022 Russian invasion of Ukraine
Attacks during the New Year celebrations